Junior Warrant Officer (JWO) Noah Nirmal Tom (born 13 November 1994) is an Indian athlete and a Junior-Commissioned Officer (JCO) in the Indian Air Force. He is from Chakkittapara of Kozhikode district in Kerala state.  He competed in the mixed 4 × 400 metres relay event at the 2019 World Athletics Championships, and 2020 Tokyo Olympics which were held on 2021. Noah studied at Silver Hills School, where his teacher Jose Sebastian first recognised his talent.

References

External links
 

1994 births
Living people
People from Kozhikode district
Athletes from Kerala
Indian male sprinters
World Athletics Championships athletes for India
Athletes (track and field) at the 2020 Summer Olympics
Olympic athletes of India
Athletes (track and field) at the 2022 Commonwealth Games
Commonwealth Games competitors for India